Phthirusa is a South American genus of parasitic shrubs in the family Loranthaceae.

Species

References

Parasitic plants
Loranthaceae
Loranthaceae genera